In the Garden is the debut studio album by the British new wave duo Eurythmics. It was released on 16 October 1981 by RCA Records.

It was co-produced with krautrock producer Conny Plank at his studio in Cologne, and features numerous guest musicians including Blondie drummer Clem Burke, Deutsch Amerikanische Freundschaft drummer Robert Görl, and Can duo Holger Czukay and Jaki Liebezeit. Plank had previously worked with the duo whilst they were in their previous band The Tourists.

Two singles were released from the album in the UK, "Never Gonna Cry Again" and "Belinda". Neither the album nor the singles achieved much commercial success, although "Never Gonna Cry Again" charted at number 63 in the UK singles chart.

On 14 November 2005, RCA repackaged and released Eurythmics' back catalogue as "2005 Deluxe Edition Reissues". The re-issue of In the Garden added the B-sides from the album's two singles, plus three tracks recorded live on the accompanying tour.

Reception
In a favourable review in Smash Hits magazine, Tim de Lisle commented "The ex-Tourists pack their bags and leave the safe pastures of pure English pop for the electronic delights of Cologne and superstar producer Connie Plank. On the way, they mug up on their Ultravox, Bowie, and Joy Division without forgetting their own roots, and the result is an intelligent, accessible first album."

Track listing

Personnel
Eurythmics
Annie Lennox - keyboards, synthesizer, flute, percussion, vocals
David A. Stewart - keyboards, synthesizer, bass guitar, guitar, backing vocals
Guest musicians
Clem Burke (of Blondie) - drums
Holger Czukay (of Can) - French horn on "Belinda" and "Never Gonna Cry Again", brass on "Your Time Will Come", Thai stringed instrument, walking
Crista Fast (wife of Conny Plank) - backing vocals on "Revenge", laughs
Robert Görl (of D.A.F.) - drums on "Belinda"
Jaki Liebezeit (of Can) - drums on "Take Me to Your Heart", "Never Gonna Cry Again" and "All the Young (People of Today)"; brass on "Your Time Will Come"
Roger Pomphrey - guitar and backing vocals on "English Summer", "Your Time Will Come", "Caveman Head" and "Sing-Sing", shouts
Markus Stockhausen (son of Karlheinz Stockhausen) - brass on "Your Time Will Come"
Tim Wheater - saxophone on "Never Gonna Cry Again"
Technical
Dave Hutchins - engineering
Rocking Russian - design
Peter Ashworth - sleeve photography

Charts
The album did not chart in any country upon its initial release.  The 2005 special edition, however, registered on the Australian chart.

References

Eurythmics albums
1981 debut albums
Albums produced by Conny Plank
Albums produced by David A. Stewart
RCA Records albums